Hranice is a town in Cheb District in the Karlovy Vary Region of the Czech Republic. It has about 2,100 inhabitants.

Administrative parts
Villages of Pastviny, Studánka and Trojmezí are administrative parts of Hranice.

Etymology
The old German name Rossbach means "Horse brook", referring to the brook where first inhabitants watered their horses. Therefore the horse appears on the town's coat of arms and flag.

In Czech, hranice means "border". Following the partition of Germany, a border tripoint (between Czechoslovakia, West and East Germany) was situated near the town, for which the village of Trojmezí (literally "Tripoint") is named. The village is also the tripoint of the three historical regions of Bohemia, Bavaria and Saxony.

Geography
It lies in the Aš Panhandle region, in the westernnmost part of the region, on the border with Germany. It neighbors the German municipalities of Bad Elster to the southeast, Adorf to the northeast, Eichigt to the north, Regnitzlosau to the west, and Rehau to the southwest.

Hranice is situated in the Fichtel Mountains. The area is rich on minor watercourses. The Hranický/Tetterweinbach brook springs in the town and flows through Hranice, the streams Bystřina and Rokytnice form a significant part of the Czech-German border.

History
The town was probably founded at the turn of the 12th and 13th centuries. The first unverified mentions of the town comes from the beginning of the 14th century. The first verified written mention of Hranice dates to 1413, when the town was bought by the House of Zedtwitz. Before that time, Hranice was the property of the Neippergs. At the end of the 14th century, the Neippergs ran into financial trouble and sold the town. The House of Zedwitz controlled Hranice and the whole region around Aš for almost 500 years.

In 1822 a new school was built. In 1850, a post office was opened and in 1868, the first fire squad was established. In 1882, Hranice was promoted to a market town.

In the 1930s, a group of Sudeten German settlers from Hranice emigrated into Chile and founded the settlement of Puyuhuapi, where they lived and intermarried with Mapuches from Chiloé Archipelago.

Textile industry
In the 19th century, the textile industry expanded rapidly in the region, including in Hranice. Beginning in 1806, a local textile factory was one of the most successful in Bohemia. In 1840, however, a plan to build a new road through the town was rejected by the local council. Because Hranice had no railway connection and only bad roads, the textile industry there began to decline. Two new railway routes – one from Aš to Hranice (established in 1885) and the other from Hranice to Adorf (established in 1906) – helped the local industry greatly.

Demographics

Sights
Notable buildings in Hranice include the Evangelic church, built in the 17th century, and the Catholic Church of the Visitation of the Virgin Mary, built in 1894.

There are several memorials: a World War I memorial built in 1928, a World War II memorial, and a memorial to a Royal Air Force pilot who crashed in the area during World War II.

Notable people
Rudolf Dölling (1902–1975), German politician and major general

Gallery

References

External links

Cities and towns in the Czech Republic
Populated places in Cheb District